Bourglinster Castle is located in the village of Bourglinster in central Luxembourg some  to the east of Luxembourg City. Now housing a restaurant and facilities for business and cultural gatherings, the castle has a history stretching back to the 11th century.

History
 
The castle is first mentioned in 1098 as belonging to St Symeon of Trier. At the time it had a residential keep, a chapel and a wall. During the second half of the 14th century, the chapel was extended and a tower was added on the northern side. The lower castle with a moat and two defensive towers was built in the 15th century. Both castles were partly destroyed during the 16th century wars (1542–1544) but were soon repaired and a Renaissance wing was added (1548). 

Parts of the lower castle were again destroyed by the French in the 1680s. In the early 18th century, a Baroque façade was built at the far end of the courtyard. After the castle was acquired by the Luxembourg State in 1968, the buildings were fully restored and, in 1982, opened for exhibitions, concerts, meetings and receptions.

Business and cultural facilities

The castle' s three banqueting halls with facilities for up to 200 people offer venues for business meetings, gala dinners and cultural events. La Distillerie, a restaurant on the castle premises, is considered to be one of the best in Luxembourg.

See also
List of castles in Luxembourg

References

External links
Château de Bourglinster website with details of restaurants, opening hours and events.

Castles in Luxembourg
Junglinster
Hotels in Luxembourg
Convention centres in Luxembourg